Alex Della Valle (born 13 June 1990) is a Sammarinese footballer who plays as a full-back for SC Faetano.

He has been capped by the San Marino national football team and made his international debut in 2010.

External links
 
 

1990 births
Living people
Sammarinese footballers
San Marino international footballers
S.C. Faetano players
A.S.D. Verucchio players
Association football defenders
Sammarinese expatriate footballers
Sammarinese expatriate sportspeople in Italy
Expatriate footballers in Italy
Campionato Sammarinese di Calcio players